Kani Tayer (also Romanized as Kānī Ţāyer; also known as Kānī Tāber) is a village in Margavar Rural District, Silvaneh District, Urmia County, West Azerbaijan Province, Iran. At the 2006 census, its population was 65, in 10 families.

References 

Populated places in Urmia County